Nicolae Manea (11 March 1954 – 15 December 2014) was a Romanian football player and manager.

Life and career
Manea was born in Bucharest. He joined Rapid București at the age of 12 and played there professionally from 1973 to 1980 and again from 1981 to 1987. He had a short stint with Steaua București in 1980 and ended his career playing for Gloria Bistrița in the late 80s. He scored both of Rapid's goals in the 2–1 victory against Universitatea Craiova in the 1975 Cupa României final.

International career
Nicolae Manea played one game for Romania when coach Ștefan Kovács used him in a friendly which ended 2–2 against Iran, played on Aryamehr Stadium from Tehran.

Coaching career
He coached Drobeta-Turnu Severin, Unirea Dej, Bihor Oradea, Rapid București (several times), Ceahlăul Piatra Neamț, FC Brașov, Gloria Bistrița, Corona Brașov and the Romanian national under-21 football team.

Death
He was diagnosed with liver cancer at the beginning of 2014. He died on 15 December 2014, in Bucharest.

Honours

Player
Rapid București
Divizia B (2): 1974–75, 1982–83
Cupa României (1): 1974–75
Gloria Bistrița
Divizia B (1): 1989–90

Manager
Rapid București
Divizia A (1): 1998–99

Notes

References

1954 births
2014 deaths
Deaths from liver cancer
Footballers from Bucharest
Romanian footballers
Association football forwards
Olympic footballers of Romania
Romania international footballers
FC Rapid București players
FC Steaua București players
ACF Gloria Bistrița players
Liga I players
Liga II players
Romanian football managers
FC Rapid București managers
FC Brașov (1936) managers
ACF Gloria Bistrița managers
FC Unirea Dej managers
FC Bihor Oradea managers
CSM Ceahlăul Piatra Neamț managers
CSM Corona Brașov (football) managers
Romanian sports executives and administrators
FC Rapid București assistant managers
FC Rapid București presidents